The list of shipwrecks in April 1828 includes all ships sunk, foundered, grounded, or otherwise lost during April 1828.

2 April

3 April

4 April

5 April

6 April

8 April

15 April

16 April

18 April

20 April

21 April

24 April

26 April

27 April

29 April

Unknown date

References

1828-04